Sam Goodwin (born January 20, 1944) is a former American football coach and athletic director. He served as the head football coach at Southern Arkansas University from 1979 to 1980  and at Northwestern State University in Natchitoches, Louisiana from 1983 to 1999, compiling a career college football coaching record of 111–99–4.

Head coaching record

College

References

1944 births
Living people
American football guards
Arkansas Razorbacks football coaches
Henderson State Reddies athletic directors
Henderson State Reddies football players
Northwestern State Demons football coaches
Southern Arkansas Muleriders football coaches
High school football coaches in Arkansas
People from Pineville, Louisiana
Players of American football from Louisiana
Sportspeople from Rapides Parish, Louisiana